Harold Martin "Kid" Gore (January 1, 1891 – June 4, 1969) was the head coach of the University of Massachusetts Amherst, football team from 1919 to 1927 (then the Massachusetts Agricultural College). He compiled a 33–32–5 overall record. Gore also served as head coach for the men's basketball team, and baseball team. Gore is the grandfather of Mark Oliver Everett, a.k.a. "E", of the independent rock band Eels.

Head coaching record

Football

Basketball

Baseball

References

1891 births
1969 deaths
American football quarterbacks
College men's basketball head coaches in the United States
UMass Minutemen baseball coaches
UMass Minutemen basketball coaches
UMass Minutemen football coaches
UMass Minutemen football players
Sportspeople from Cambridge, Massachusetts
Coaches of American football from Massachusetts
Players of American football from Massachusetts
Baseball coaches from Massachusetts
Basketball coaches from Massachusetts